Solly Ward (October 11, 1890 – May 17, 1942) was an American actor and comedian. He appeared in the films Flight from Glory, Living on Love, Danger Patrol, She's Got Everything, Everybody's Doing It, Maid's Night Out, This Marriage Business, Blind Alibi, Smashing the Rackets, Conspiracy, Sued for Libel and Footlight Fever.

He died on May 17, 1942, in Hollywood, Los Angeles, California at age 51.

References

External links
 

1890 births
1942 deaths
20th-century American male actors
American male film actors